Griffin Gluck (born August 24, 2000) is an American actor. In television, he is known for his roles as Charlie in Red Band Society, Mason Warner in Private Practice, and Danny Gannon in Back in the Game. He also starred as a main character in the Hulu movie Big Time Adolescence. He acted as Sam Ecklund in both seasons of the Netflix mockumentary series American Vandal and played Gabe in the Netflix series Locke & Key. In film, he portrayed Rafe Khatchadorian in the film Middle School: The Worst Years of My Life and Jack Dunkleman in the Netflix original movie Tall Girl.

Early life
Gluck was born in Los Angeles. His father, Cellin Gluck, is a film director and producer, and his mother, Karin Beck, was a production assistant and line producer. Griffin's father was born in Wakayama Prefecture, Japan, to American parents, and was raised partly in Kobe, Japan. Griffin's paternal grandparents were Sumi (Hiramoto), a Japanese American, and Jay Gluck, a Jewish American archaeologist, historian, and Japanophile.

Career
Gluck started acting when he went with his older sister, Caroline, to a summer children's showcase of Guys and Dolls at the Palisades Playhouse. His first major role was as a three-year-old in a short film, Time Out, co-produced by his father and directed by Robbie Chafitz.

His big break came in 2011, when he played Michael in the film Just Go with It, for which he received a Young Artist Award nomination. He was later cast as Mason Warner on Private Practice, and was then upped to series regular on the show. After the series was cancelled, he joined a TV pilot called Back in the Game from 20th Century Fox TV. It was picked to series. The show was canceled in November 2013 

In 2014, Gluck co-starred as Charlie on the Fox series Red Band Society, in which his character, who is in a coma, is the narrator of the show. In March 2015, he was cast in an NBC pilot, Cuckoo, which was not picked for series.

Gluck had his first film lead role playing Rafe Khatchadorian in the 2016 movie Middle School: The Worst Years of My Life, based on the hit novel by James Patterson.

Filmography

Film

Television

Awards and nominations 
Gluck was nominated in the "Best Performance in a Feature Film – Supporting Young Actor" category for his work in Just Go with It at the 33rd Young Artist Awards.

References

External links
 

2000 births
Living people
American male film actors
American male television actors
Male actors from Los Angeles
21st-century American male actors
American male child actors